Elections to Durham County Council took place on 5 May 2005, as part of the 2005 local elections in the United Kingdom. The election also took place on the same day as the 2005 general election. This was the council's final election before it became a unitary authority as part of changes to local government in 2009, with the first elections to the new unitary council taking place in 2008. New electoral division boundaries were introduced for this election, with 63 divisions returning one councillor each using the first past the post voting system.

Labour kept control of the council with 53 seats. The Liberal Democrats were second with five seats and the Conservatives won two seats. There were also three independents elected, including two from the Derwentside Independents group.

Results

|-
! style="background-color:#ffffff; width: 3px;" |  
| style="width: 130px" |Derwentside Independents
| align="right" | 2
| align="right" | N/A
| align="right" | N/A
| align="right" | N/A
| align="right" | 3.2%
| align="right" | 3.6%
| align="right" | 7,835
| align="right" | N/A
|-

|}

Results by electoral division

Chester-le-Street (7 seats)

Derwentside (11 seats)

Durham (11 seats)

Easington (12 seats)

Sedgefield (11 seats)

Teesdale (3 seats)

Wear Valley (8 seats)

References

2005 English local elections
2005
2000s in County Durham